Gerhardsson is a patronymic surname, literally meaning "son of Gerhard". Notable people with the surname include:

 Birger Gerhardsson (1926–2013), Swedish Biblical scholar
 Gerhard Gerhardsson (1792–1878), Swedish preacher
 Peter Gerhardsson (born 1959), Swedish footballer and manager

Patronymic surnames
Swedish-language surnames